Eva Plotek née Pagels (born 31 October 1954) is a retired German field hockey player.

Pagels played for Eintracht Braunschweig. She joined the club as a youth player in 1966 and was promoted to the first team in 1973. With Braunschweig, she won seven German championship titles. She also played 61 games in total for the German national team.

With West Germany, Pagels won the 1981 Women's Hockey World Cup. She was also called up to the West German squad for the 1980 Summer Olympics. However, due to the 1980 Summer Olympics boycott, the West German team ultimately didn't enter the tournament.

In 1981, Pagels was awarded the Silbernes Lorbeerblatt. In 1988, she was inducted into the hall of fame of the Lower Saxon Institute of Sports History.

References 

Living people
1954 births
German female field hockey players
Sportspeople from Braunschweig
Recipients of the Silver Laurel Leaf